The Kerala Sahitya Akademi Award for Biography and Autobiography is an award given every year by the Kerala Sahitya Akademi (Kerala Literary Academy) to Malayalam writers for writing a biography or autobiography of literary merit. It is one of the twelve categories of the Kerala Sahitya Akademi Award.

Awardees

References

Awards established in 1992
Kerala Sahitya Akademi Awards
Malayalam literary awards
Biography awards
1992 establishments in Kerala